Owen John Thomas (born 3 October 1939) is a former Plaid Cymru politician who was a Member of the Welsh Assembly (AM) for the South Wales Central region from 1999 to 2007.

Early life and education
Owen John Thomas was born in Albany Road, Cardiff, where his father, John Owen Thomas, had a pharmacy. John Owen Thomas was from Treorchy and the brother of the Alderman Reverend Degwel Thomas, the Chairman of Glamorgan Council for 19 years. On his paternal side both his grandparents spoke Welsh and came from a prominent family of Welsh Baptists in North Pembrokeshire, including the poet preacher Myfyr Emlyn. Thomas' mother, Evelyn Jane Thomas, came from Marros in Carmarthenshire, and her father was Welsh speaking. Despite having Welsh speaking grandparents Thomas' parents did not speak Welsh as adults, and therefore, he and his two sisters were raised in an English language home.

Thomas was a pupil at Marlborough Road School, Cardiff, and at Howardian Grammar School. He left school at sixteen to work in the docks, and had various other jobs including as an analytical chemist. Thomas later attended the Glamorgan College of Education and the University of Wales, Cardiff, where he completed an MA in the history of the Welsh Language. This formed part of his chapter in the book Iaith Carreg fy Aelwyd, published in 1998, and its English language version.

Thomas was deputy headteacher of Gladstone Primary School before being elected to the National Assembly for Wales. He is a former chairman of the Cardiff region of the UCAC trade union. Thomas has been active in Plaid Cymru since his teens, filling a variety of posts from branch secretary to vice president. At the 1981 Plaid Cymru Conference, he succeeded in having 'socialism' included amongst the party's main aims. He is a longstanding champion of the campaign for leasehold reform and a founder member of Clwb Ifor Bach (Cardiff's Welsh Language night club), whose president he was from 1983 to 1989. He learned Welsh in his late twenties and played a key role in promoting Welsh medium education in the city, naming several of the schools with historic Cardiff Welsh names.

Political career

From 1999 to 2007 Thomas was a member of the National Assembly for Wales, representing the South Wales Central region for Plaid Cymru. He was Shadow Minister for Culture at the National Assembly for Wales. Thomas was a firm supporter of Dafydd Wigley's leadership and resisted the challenges against Wigley. Despite his strong convictions that Plaid Cymru had made a mistake in losing Wigley as party leader, Thomas remained loyal to the party whip and its new leader Ieuan Wyn Jones. Thomas faced a strong challenge for the 2003 regional seat selection, but comfortably won the membership vote.

A strong supporter of the Welsh language and Welsh history, he wrote in the Western Mail that "The language is a national asset and its revitalisation can play a central part in the larger process of nation building and economic and social regeneration." He also complained that Welsh children are taught "the history of England, not the history of Britain".

His proudest achievements as an AM include an unsuccessful campaign to have St David's Day recognised as a bank holiday, his role in the creation of the Wales Millennium Centre, his campaigns for the Allied Steel and Wire pension fund, and to bring brachytherapy, a cancer treatment, to Wales.

Thomas was the Plaid Cymru candidate for the Cathays ward in the May 2008 Cardiff local elections, increasing the vote and receiving the highest vote that Plaid Cymru has achieved in that ward. He also ran for that ward in the 1983 local election.

Later life

Following retirement at the age of 67, Thomas remained active within Plaid Cymru, serving as the party's chair in Cardiff Central and in Cardiff. He is the longest serving trustee of Tŷ'r Cymry, a house given to the Welsh speakers of Cardiff in 1936.

In November 2020, his book, The Welsh Language in Cardiff : A History of Survival was published by Y Lolfa. The book is an attack on the myth that Cardiff has been an English speaking town since the Anglo-Norman conquest of Cardiff in 1100, emphasising instead that a very significant element of its population have been Welsh speaking throughout history.

Personal life 
Thomas has been married to Siân Wyn Evans, a former headteacher of Ysgol Glan Morfa, Splott, since 1985. The couple have twin sons. Thomas has three sons and a daughter from a previous marriage. His youngest son, Rhys ab Owen, also a Plaid Cymru politician, was elected on the South Wales Central regional list in the 2021 Senedd election, the same seat Thomas had represented fourteen years earlier. Another son, Rhodri ab Owen, is the Chief Executive of the Cardiff Bay lobbying firm Positif.

In 2020, it was reported that Owen John Thomas was now resident in a care home for people living with dementia.

References

External links
Guardian Unlimited Article, 7 March 2007,  giving details of Assembly Members who were not seeking re-election

Offices held

1939 births
Living people
Alumni of Cardiff University
Plaid Cymru members of the Senedd
Wales AMs 1999–2003
Wales AMs 2003–2007
Politicians from Cardiff